Babai is a 2015 internationally co-produced drama film directed by Visar Morina. Morina won the Best Director Award at the 50th Karlovy Vary International Film Festival. The film was selected as the Kosovan entry for the Best Foreign Language Film at the 88th Academy Awards but it was not nominated. It is the most expensive Kosovan film produced, with a budget of €1.7 million.

Cast
 Val Maloku as Nori
 Astrit Kabashi as Gëzim
 Adriana Matoshi as Valentina
 Enver Petrovci as Adem
 Xhevdet Jashari as Bedri

See also
 List of submissions to the 88th Academy Awards for Best Foreign Language Film
 List of Kosovan submissions for the Academy Award for Best Foreign Language Film

References

External links
 

2015 films
2015 drama films
Kosovan drama films
German drama films
Albanian-language films
2015 directorial debut films
2010s German films